Schubert Sonata is an outdoor 1992 partially painted steel sculpture by Mark di Suvero, installed at Olympic Sculpture Park in Seattle, Washington.

See also

 1992 in art

References

1992 sculptures
Olympic Sculpture Park
Steel sculptures in Washington (state)